Chance Acquaintance is a 1927 play by the British writer John Van Druten, one of his earliest.

It was staged at the Criterion Theatre in the West End for a run of 19 performances between 2 and 19 November 1927. The cast included Helen Haye, Robert Andrews, Benita Hume, Una O'Connor and Reginald Gardiner.

References

Bibliography
 Wearing, J. P. The London Stage 1920-1929: A Calendar of Productions, Performers, and Personnel. Rowman & Littlefield, 2014.

1927 plays
Plays by John Van Druten
West End plays